Scleroderma citrinum, commonly known as the common earthball, pigskin poison puffball, or common earth ball, is the most common species of earthball in the UK and occurs widely in woods, heathland and in short grass from autumn to winter.
Scleroderma citrinum has two synonyms, Scleroderma aurantium (Vaill.) and Scleroderma vulgare Horn.

Earthballs are superficially similar to, and considered look-alikes of, the edible puffball (particularly Apioperdon pyriforme), but whereas the puffball has a single opening on top through which the spores are dispersed, the earthball just breaks up to release the spores. Moreover, Scleroderma citrinum has much firmer flesh and a dark gleba (interior) much earlier in development than puffballs. Scleroderma citrinum has no stem but is attached to the soil by mycelial cords.  The peridium, or outer wall, is thick and firm, usually ochre yellow externally with irregular warts.

The earthball may be parasitized by Pseudoboletus parasiticus.

Scleroderma citrinum can be mistaken with truffles by inexperienced mushroom hunters. Ingestion of Scleroderma citrinum can cause gastrointestinal distress in humans and animals. Some individuals may experience lacrimation, rhinitis and rhinorrhea, and conjunctivitis from exposure to its spores.

Pigments found in the fruiting body of Scleroderma citrinum Pers. are sclerocitrin, norbadione A, xerocomic acid, and badione A.

Notes

References

External links
Medicinal Mushrooms Description, bioactive compounds, medicinal properties
Mushroom Expert Additional information

Boletales
Fungi of Europe
Poisonous fungi
Puffballs